Joseph Anthony Bitker (born February 12, 1964) is a former Major League Baseball pitcher who played for two seasons. He played for the Oakland Athletics for one game on July 31, 1990, then was traded to the Texas Rangers with Scott Chiamparino for Harold Baines. He then played for the Rangers in 1990 and 1991.

External links

1964 births
Living people
Oakland Athletics players
Texas Rangers players
Major League Baseball pitchers
Baseball players from California
Sacramento City Panthers baseball players
Beaumont Golden Gators players
Charleston Rainbows players
Las Vegas Stars (baseball) players
Oklahoma City 89ers players
Spokane Indians players
Tacoma Tigers players